Russian bank can refer to:
:Category:Banks of Russia
List of banks in Russia
Russian Bank, a card game for two players